Miyagi 2nd district is a single-member constituency of the House of Representatives, the lower house of the National Diet of Japan. It is located on the island of Honshu, in Miyagi Prefecture, and includes parts of the city of Sendai, the prefectural capital (the city is shared with District 2).

As of 2020, the district was home to 454,848 constituents.

The district is represented by Ken'ya Akiba of the Liberal Democratic Party.

Seat Representatives

Areas Covered 
Since its was formed in 1994 as a single member constituency, it has been made up of the following Areas:

 Sendai
 Miyagino-ku
 Wakabayashi-ku
 Izumi-ku

Election Results

References

Related 

Politics of Miyagi Prefecture
Districts of the House of Representatives (Japan)